Caudellia pilosa is a species of snout moth in the genus Caudellia. It was described by Herbert H. Neunzig in 2006 and is known from the Dominican Republic.

References

Moths described in 1996
Phycitinae